Gideon Yego (born 28 August 1965) is a retired Kenyan athlete who specialized in the 400 metres hurdles.

He won silver medals at the 1987 All-Africa Games (in 110 metres hurdles), the 1990 Commonwealth Games, the 1990 African Championships and the 1991 All-Africa Games, the latter in a career best time of 49.09 seconds.

He also competed at the 1988 and 1992 Olympic Games as well as the 1991 World Championships without reaching the final.

Achievements

References

External links

1965 births
Living people
Kenyan male hurdlers
Athletes (track and field) at the 1988 Summer Olympics
Athletes (track and field) at the 1990 Commonwealth Games
Athletes (track and field) at the 1992 Summer Olympics
Olympic athletes of Kenya
Commonwealth Games medallists in athletics
Commonwealth Games silver medallists for Kenya
African Games silver medalists for Kenya
African Games medalists in athletics (track and field)
Athletes (track and field) at the 1987 All-Africa Games
Medallists at the 1990 Commonwealth Games